Lady Windermere's Fan is a 1935 German comedy film directed by Heinz Hilpert and starring Lil Dagover, Walter Rilla and Aribert Wäscher. It is based on the play Lady Windermere's Fan by Oscar Wilde. The film's sets were designed by the art director Heinrich Beisenherz and Ludwig Reiber.

Cast

References

Bibliography

External links

1935 films
Films of Nazi Germany
1930s German-language films
Films based on Lady Windermere's Fan
Films directed by Heinz Hilpert
1935 comedy films
German comedy films
Films set in London
Films set in England
UFA GmbH films
Tobis Film films
German black-and-white films
1930s German films